The 1977 Japan Open Tennis Championships was a men's tennis tournament played on hard courts and part of the 1977 Colgate-Palmolive Grand Prix and took place in Tokyo, Japan. The tournament was held from 31 October through 6 November 1977. First-seeded Manuel Orantes won the singles title.

Finals

Singles
 Manuel Orantes defeated  Kim Warwick, 6–2, 6–1

Doubles
 Geoff Masters /  Kim Warwick defeated  Colin Dibley /  Chris Kachel, 6–2, 7–6

References

External links
 Official website
  Association of Tennis Professionals (ATP) tournament profile

Japan Open Tennis Championships
Japan Open Tennis Championships
Japan Open Tennis Championships
Japan Open Tennis Championships
Japan Open (tennis)